James Trotter may refer to:

 James Trotter (British Army officer) (1849–1940), British general
 James Trotter (Ontario politician) (1923–1989), member of the Legislative Assembly of Ontario in Canada
 James F. Trotter (1802–1866), United States Senator from Mississippi, state supreme court judge and lawyer
 James Monroe Trotter (1842–1892), soldier and African American rights activist
 James Henry Trotter, title character of Roald Dahl's James and the Giant Peach

See also
 Jimmy Trotter (1899–1984), English football player and manager